Edward Drummond-Hay may refer to:

Edward Drummond-Hay (antiquarian) (1785–1845), British antiquarian and diplomat
Edward Drummond-Hay (Royal Navy officer) (1815–1884), British naval officer and colonial administrator